Timothy Grimes, better known by his stage name Wise Intelligent, is an American hip hop musician from Trenton, New Jersey. He is a member of Poor Righteous Teachers. He released The Talented Timothy Taylor in 2007. His third solo studio album, The Unconkable Djezuz Djonez, was released in 2011. In 2012, Complex included him on the "50 Most Slept-On Rappers of All Time" list. In 2017, he released a collaborative album with Gensu Dean, titled Game of Death.

Discography

Studio albums
 Killin' U... for Fun (1996)
 The Talented Timothy Taylor (2007)
 The Unconkable Djezuz Djonez (2011)
 El Negro Guerrero (2013)
 Stevie Bonneville Wallace (2016)
 The Blue Klux Klan (2017)
 Game of Death  (2017)
 Ponzie (2018)

Compilation albums
 Blessed Be the Poor? (2007)

Extended plays
 Omnicide  (2020)

Singles
 "Killin'-U" b/w "Tu-Shoom-Pang" (1995)
 "Rastafarian Girl" (1996)
 "Never Kill Again" b/w "Freestyle" (1996)
 "Steady Slangin'" b/w "My Sound" (1996)

Guest appearances
 Steve Harvey - "I'm the One" (1990)
 Professor Griff - "Verbal Intercourse" from Black Draft (1993)
 Nitty Gritty - "Good Morning Teacher" (1995)
 Assassin - "Wake Up! (Réveillez-Vous!)" from Perles Rares (1989-2002) (2004)
 Jel - "WMD" from Soft Money (2006)
 Blue Sky Black Death - "Engage My Words" from A Heap of Broken Images (2006)
 Oh No - "Black" from Exodus into Unheard Rhythms (2006)
 Snowgoons - "Teacher's Trademark" from German Lugers (2007)
 Truth Universal - "Black Culture" from Self Determination (2008)
 Blee - "Figured Out" from Cosmos Road (2010)
 Bombshell - "The Highest" from The Premix (2010)
 Rockin' Squat - "Démocratie Fasciste (Article 5)" from Confessions d'un Enfant du Siècle: Volume 3 (2010)
 Rockin' Squat - "Démocratie Fasciste (Article 5)" and "Wake Up" from US Alien (Chapter One) (2011)
 Reef the Lost Cauze & Snowgoons - "Mount Up" from Your Favorite MC (2011)
 Beneficence - "Royal Dynasty (Remix)" from Sidewalk Science (2011)
 J. Rawls - "Face It" from The Hip-Hop Affect (2011)
 Billions - "Die Slow" from A Secret Worth Billions (2012)
 Def Dee - "Lightning I'm Igniting" from 33 and a Third (2013)
 The White Shadow - "Trust Issues" from Destroyer (2014)

References

External links
 
 
 

Living people
1970 births
Five percenters
American hip hop record producers
Rappers from New Jersey
21st-century American rappers
21st-century African-American musicians